José Ramón Ceschi (9 January 1941 – 16 October 2021) was an Argentine Catholic priest, philosopher, writer and TV presenter.

Biography
José Ceschi was born on 9 January 1941 in La Penca, Province of Santa Fe, Argentina, began to dabble in religion when he was 16 years old, the age at which he made the novitiate and at 23 years old he was ordained a priest of the Franciscan order in the City of Rosario in 1964. He studied several languages in the United Kingdom and France, when he returned to Argentina he taught theology classes in the city of Rosario. 

In 2017, he suffered a stroke in which he had to be intervened, since then his health was compromised. After this, he was the target of fake news on numerous occasions, about his condition of health.

Death 
On 16 October 2021, the San Francisco Solano de Rosario Parish confirmed Ceschi's death with a statement.

References 

1941 births
2021 deaths
20th-century Argentine Roman Catholic priests
21st-century Argentine Roman Catholic priests
Argentine philosophers
People from Santa Fe Province